Julia Doria is a Slovene writer, illustrator and visual artist. Ljubljana, Slovenia. She writes children's books and prose fiction for adults. Her illustrations appear in children's picture books and in prose fiction and nonfiction books.

Life and work
She graduated from the Faculty of Arts, Library and Information Science and Book Studies in Ljubljana in 2004 and from Academy of Fine Arts, Illustration & Visual Communication Design in Ljubljana in 2015.  Since 2005 she has run her publishing house Atelje Doria.

Published works
 Kresnička in njena lučka (The little Firefly and her Light), children's book, 2007 
 Naša kužica zaspanka (Our Puppy the Sleepyhead), children's book, 2007 
 Aidor – Legenda o Griču tisočerih rož (Aidor – The Legend of Thousand Fower Hill), prose, 2007 
 Netopirček Tinček (Tincek, the little Bat), children's book, 2008 
 Mavrica pripoveduje (The Rainbow is talking), children's book, 2010 
 Kresnička Sija in pikapolonica Lili na mavrični gugalnici (Sija the Firefly and Lili the Ladybug on Rainbow Swing ), children's book, 2011 
 Kako je muren Vladimir presenetil svet (How Vladimir the Cricket surprised the World), children's book, 2011 
 Diamanti na tvojem dvorišču (Diamonds in Your own Backyard), prose, 2011 
 Samoregulacija in učenje (Self-regulation and learning), 2011 
 Psička Pia in borovnice (Puppy Pia and the blueberries), children's book, 2012 
 Povodni mož Svit je zaljubljen (Svit the Water Man is in Love), children's book, 2012 
 Keltski vrt (Celtic garden), 2013 
 Vesoljček Pi (Alien Pi), children's book, 2015 
 Rdeči jelen in lešniki (The red Deer and the Hazelnuts), children's book, 2016 
 Feniks : grenko sladka mikropoezija, poetry, 2017 
 Abeceda z žužki, children's book, 2016 
 Marsovčki na počitnicah, children's book, 2017 , English translation When little Martians had holidays 
 Metulj Modrin in čarobni vrt, children's book, 2017 , English translation The Chapman's Blue butterfly and the secret garden  
 Cvetek, ki se ni hotel zmočiti, children's book, 2017 , English translation A floret that did not want to get wet  
 Taščica, children's book, 2018 , English translation The redbreast 
 Radovedni podlesek Albert, children's book, 2018 , English translation Curious Albert the hazel dormouse   
 Glej, žaba!, children's book, 2018 , English translation Look, a frog! 
 Čmrlj Brenčač, children's book, 2018 , English translation The buzzing bumblebee 
 Dežela sneženega moža, children's book, 2019 , English translation The Land of the Snowman 
 Zvonček in stržek prikličeta pomlad, children's book, 2019 , English translation The snowdrop and the wren summon the spring 
 Vrt škrata Avgusta, children's book, 2019 , English translation The garden of August the dwarf 
 Žužkopis : slikopis z žuželkami, children's book, 2019 
 Ptičje strašilo in lastovka, children's book, 2019 , English translation The scarecrow and the swallow

References

Sources
 Profession: Writer, illustrator – Interview
 Mavrica.net, published articles
 Kresnik.eu, published articles
 Wikinavedek, quotes

External links
 Julia Doria, Books
 Julia Doria, Illustrations & paintings

Slovenian children's writers
Slovenian women poets
Slovenian poets
Slovenian illustrators
Slovenian children's book illustrators
Slovenian women children's writers
Slovenian women artists
Artists from Ljubljana
Writers from Ljubljana
Living people
University of Ljubljana alumni
Slovenian women illustrators
21st-century Slovenian women writers
21st-century women artists
Year of birth missing (living people)